Chris Wilson (born October 16, 1984) is an American professional golfer.

Wilson was born in Columbus, Ohio. He played college golf at Northwestern University and won the Big Ten Championship in 2006. He graduated in 2007 and turned professional.

Wilson played on the PGA Tour in 2010 after earning his card at Qualifying school. His best finish was T-51 at the Valero Texas Open; he only made seven cuts in 26 events and lost his PGA Tour privileges. He played on the Web.com Tour in 2012 and won his first tour event in August at the Price Cutter Charity Championship.

Professional wins (1)

Web.com Tour wins (1)

Web.com Tour playoff record (1–0)

See also
2009 PGA Tour Qualifying School graduates

References

External links

American male golfers
Northwestern Wildcats men's golfers
PGA Tour golfers
Golfers from Columbus, Ohio
People from Dublin, Ohio
1984 births
Living people